North Wantagh is a hamlet and census-designated place in the Town of Hempstead in Nassau County, on the South Shore of Long Island, in New York, United States. The population was 11,960 at the 2010 census.

Geography

Since North Wantagh does not have a post office of its own, all places in the hamlet have either a "Wantagh, NY 11793" or "Seaford, NY 11783" mailing address. Non-conforming postal codes lead to a general misconception of the actual boundaries of this, and surrounding, areas. Parts of North Wantagh are more commonly referred to as simply "Wantagh" or "Seaford," while school service is provided by Levittown.

Demographics

As of the census of 2000, there were 12,156 people, 4,332 households, and 3,404 families residing in the CDP. The population density was 6,592.0 per square mile (2,550.8/km2). There were 4,374 housing units at an average density of 2,371.9/sq mi (917.8/km2). The racial makeup of the CDP was 96.00% White, 0.45% African American, 0.01% Native American, 1.82% Asian, 0.01% Pacific Islander, 0.80% from other races, and 0.91% from two or more races. Hispanic or Latino of any race were 4.57% of the population.

There were 4,332 households, out of which 34.0% had children under the age of 18 living with them, 67.1% were married couples living together, 8.3% had a female householder with no husband present, and 21.4% were non-families. 18.8% of all households were made up of individuals, and 11.1% had someone living alone who was 65 years of age or older. The average household size was 2.80 and the average family size was 3.20.

In the CDP, the population was spread out, with 23.6% under the age of 18, 6.3% from 18 to 24, 29.3% from 25 to 44, 24.7% from 45 to 64, and 16.2% who were 65 years of age or older. The median age was 40 years. For every 100 females, there were 91.3 males. For every 100 females age 18 and over, there were 86.8 males.

The median income for a household in the CDP was $70,252, and the median income for a family was $76,345. Males had a median income of $53,295 versus $37,005 for females. The per capita income for the CDP was $30,214. About 1.4% of families and 2.9% of the population were below the poverty line, including 1.4% of those under age 18 and 5.7% of those age 65 or over.

Education
North Wantagh is served entirely by the following schools in the Levittown Union Free School District.

Elementary schools (K-5) 
 East Broadway Elementary School
 Lee Road Elementary School
 Gardiners Avenue Elementary School

Middle schools (6-8) 
 Jonas E. Salk Middle School

High school (9-12) 
 General Douglas MacArthur High School

Transportation
Public transportation in North Wantagh is provided by the n54/n55 lines of the Nassau Inter-County Express. The closest rail service is provided by the Wantagh station on the Long Island Rail Road's Babylon Branch.

The Southern State Parkway, Wantagh Parkway and Seaford-Oyster Bay Expressway all traverse and have exits/entrances within North Wantagh. The main commercial thoroughfare is Wantagh Avenue.

References

External links
 www.Wantagh.LI
 Wantagh Chamber of Commerce

Census-designated places in New York (state)
Hempstead, New York
Census-designated places in Nassau County, New York